Quintus Caecilius Metellus Nepos (c. 135 BC – 55 BC) was a senator and consul. 

Metellus Nepos was a son of Quintus Caecilius Metellus Balearicus. He served as praetor some time before the year 100 BC and possibly as aedile .

He was elected consul in 98 BC with Titus Didius as his colleague. During his consulship, he brought legislation, the leges Caeciliae-Didiae, which required bills brought before the assemblies to have only one topic and mandated that three market days must elapse between a bill's presentation and a vote thereon. 

Metellus Nepos married Licinia Prima, after she had divorced the Pontifex Maximus Quintus Mucius Scaevola, with whom she had a daughter Mucia Tertia. Licinia and Metellus Nepos had two children:

 Quintus Caecilius Metellus Celer
 Quintus Caecilius Metellus Nepos

See also
 Caecilia gens

Notes

Sources 

 
 

Year of birth uncertain
55 BC deaths
2nd-century BC Romans
1st-century BC Roman consuls
Nepos, Quintus (consul 656 AUC)
Optimates